Saint-Louis-lès-Bitche (literally St. Louis near Bitche; ; Lorraine Franconian: Minzdal) is a commune in the Moselle department of the Grand Est administrative region in north-eastern France.

The village belongs to the Pays de Bitche and to the Northern Vosges Regional Nature Park. As of the 2013 France census, the village's population is 512. The inhabitants of the commune are known as Ludoviciens and Ludoviciennes.

The village is famous for its Saint-Louis Glass Manufacture, as it is the oldest glass manufacturer in France with roots dating back to 1586 and the first crystal glass manufacturer in continental Europe (1781).

See also
 Communes of the Moselle department
 Saint-Louis (glass manufacturer)

References

External links
 

Communes of Moselle (department)